The FS E.632 and E.633 are two classes of Italian railways electric locomotives. They were introduced in the course of the 1980s.

The locomotives are nicknamed Tigre ("tiger").

History
The E.632/E.633 were the first Italian locomotives to be provided with electronic traction control system, on the basis of the experiments made with the E.444.005 test locomotive. They were designed to fulfill a requirement from the Ferrovie dello Stato (or FS, then the quasi-monopolist of Italian railways) for a new locomotive to be used with medium-weight passenger trains and a similar one for cargo services on steep lines.

The first unit ran on October 11, 1979. After a troublesome program of tests with the first five prototypes, a first order for 90 engines (75 E.633, the cargo version, and 15 E.632) was issued. Regular services began in 1983 in northern Italy. Once the teething problems were solved, the class proved highly successful and reliable.

Technical details

Differently from many of the previous FS classes, the E.632/633 carbody is not articulated. The power plant is made of three  FS T850 DC motors, mounted on monomotor bogies, each with two axles. Each motor is provided with a three-frequency chopper which takes place of the resistor network used on older Italian locomotives (rheostat). This allow the motors to run for an indefinite period of time without risks. 

Since the beginning, all units were provided with the standard 78-wire cable for coupling with driving passenger cars, useful in the formation of commuter push-pull trains. 40 E633s were also fitted with a 13-wire ZDS cable in order to allow hauling with multiple units by only one engine crew, from the "master" locomotive.

The locomotives have, in addition to pneumatic brakes, a rheostatic braking system. The braking rheostat is placed on the roof, between the pantographs. The air brake employs a mixed shoes-disc system (one shoe per wheel and one disc per axle), due to space issues about the motor placement; also, E.632 have  brake cylinders, while E.633 .
The chopper regulation and the rheostatic braking allow the driver to set an automatic speed control; the locomotive will try to keep the set speed by electrically braking or by tractioning if needed. This group has been the first in Italy that allowed this.

Related development
The E.632/633 was used as base for the development of the E.491/492 locomotives for use with 25 kV AC lines in Sardinia, which however were never mass built.

Class E.652 is a type of locomotive derived from E.633/2. They unite the acceleration and hauling capacities of E.633 with the speed of E.632; externally they are almost identical to E.632/3, but the electrical part is very different. The first unit was built in 1989, and have been the first Italian locomotive with electronic board diagnostics and relative screen on the driver's desk.

, 171 E.652s are assigned to the Global Logistic (Cargo) division of Trenitalia, hauling freight trains, though sometimes can be seen hauling passenger trains (often long-range ones) on rescue services due to failures.

The B-B locomotive E.620 of Ferrovie Nord Milano (nicknamed Tigrotto) is a two-bogie version of the class.

Notes

References

3000 V DC locomotives
E.632
B′B′B′ locomotives
B-B-B locomotives
Railway locomotives introduced in 1980
Railway locomotives introduced in 1983
Gio. Ansaldo & C. locomotives
TIBB locomotives
Standard gauge locomotives of Italy